This is a list of compositions by Felix Mendelssohn.

Listed by opus number
(Note: the list includes works which were published posthumously and given opus numbers after the composer's death. Only the opus numbers 1 to 72 were assigned by Mendelssohn, the later ones by publishers. The opus number sequence does not therefore always accord with the order of composition).
The list also includes the Mendelssohn-Werkverzeichnis classification code (MWV).

Works with opus number assigned by Mendelssohn

Op. 1–20
 Op. 1, Piano Quartet No. 1 in C minor (1822) (MWV Q 11)
 Op. 2, Piano Quartet No. 2 in F minor (1823) (MWV Q 13)
 Op. 3, Piano Quartet No. 3 in B minor (1824/25) (MWV Q 17)
 Op. 4, Violin Sonata (No. 2) in F minor (1823) (MWV Q 12)
 Op. 5, Capriccio in F-sharp minor for piano (1825) (MWV U 50)
 Op. 6, Piano Sonata No. 1 in E major (1826) (MWV U 54) (actually the composer's 2nd Piano Sonata)
 Op. 7, (7) Pièces caractéristiques for piano (1827)
 No. 1 Sanft und mit Empfindung (MWV U 56)
 No. 2 Mit heftiger Bewegung (MWV U 44)
 No. 3 Kräftig und feurig (MWV U 59)
 No. 4 Schnell und beweglich (MWV U 55)
 No. 5 Ernst und mit steigender Lebhaftigkeit (MWV U 60)
 No. 6 Sehnsüchtig (MWV U 61)
 No. 7 Leicht und luftig (MWV U 62)
 Op. 8, 12 Songs for voice and piano (1824/28)
 No. 1 "Minnelied im Mai: Holder klingt der Vogelsang" (MWV K 30)
 No. 2 "Das Heimweh: Was ist's das mir den Atem hemmet" (composed by Fanny Mendelssohn, but published under Felix's name)
 No. 3 "Italien: Schöner und schöner schmückt sich" (composed by Fanny Mendelssohn)
 No. 4 "Erntelied: Es ist ein Schnitter, der heißt Tod" (MWV K 37)
 No. 5 "Pilgerspruch: Laß dich nur nichts nicht dauern" (MWV K 31)
 No. 6 "Frühlingslied. In schwäb. Mundart: Jetzt kommt der Frühling" (MWV K 17)
 No. 7 "Maienlied: Man soll hören süßes Singen" (MWV K 32)
 No. 8 "Hexenlied. Andres Maienlied: Die Schwalbe fliegt" (MWV K 33)
 No. 9 "Abendlied: Das Tagewerk ist abgethan" (MWV K 34)
 No. 10 "Romanze: Einmal aus seinen Blicken" (MWV K 35)
 No. 11 "Im Grünen: Willkommen im Grünen" (MWV K 36)
 No. 12 "Suleika und Hatem: An des lust'gen Brunnens Rand" (composed by Fanny Mendelssohn)
 Op. 9, 12 Lieder for voice and piano (1829/30)
 No. 1 "Frage: Ist es wahr?" (MWV K 39)
 No. 2 "Geständnis: Kennst du nicht das Gluthverlangen" (MWV K 41)
 No. 3 "Wartend (Romanze): Sie trug einen Falken" (MWV K 42)
 No. 4 "Im Frühling: Ihr frühlingstrunknen Blumem" (MWV K 52)
 No. 5 "Im Herbst: Ach wie schnell die Tage fliehen" (MWV K 38)
 No. 6 "Scheidend: Wie so gelinde die Fluth bewegt" (MWV K 50)
 No. 7 "Sehnsucht: Fern und ferner schallt der Reigen" (composed by Fanny Mendelssohn)
 No. 8 "Frühlingsglaube: Die linden Lüfte sind erwacht" (MWV K 51)
 No. 9 "Ferne: In weite Ferne will ich träumen" (MWV K 53)
 No. 10 "Verlust: Und wussten's die Blumen" (composed by Fanny Mendelssohn)
 No. 11 "Entsagung: Herr, zu dir will ich mich retten" (MWV K 54)
 No. 12 "Die Nonne: Im stillen Klostergarten" (composed by Fanny Mendelssohn)
 Op. 10, Die Hochzeit des Camacho (The Marriage of Camacho) (Singspiel) (1825) (MWV L 5)
 Op. 11, Symphony No. 1 in C minor (1824) (MWV N 13)
 Op. 12, String Quartet No. 1 in E flat major (1829) (MWV R 25) (actually composed after Op. 13)
 Op. 13, String Quartet No. 2 in A minor (1827) (MWV R 22) (actually the composer's 1st mature String Quartet)
 Op. 14, Rondo capriccioso in E major for piano (1830) (MWV U 67)
 Op. 15, Fantasia on "The Last Rose of Summer" in E major for piano (1827) (MWV U 74)
 Op. 16, (3) Fantasies or Caprices for piano (1829)
 No. 1 Fantasia in A minor (MWV U 70)
 No. 2 Caprice or Scherzo in E minor (MWV U 71)
 No. 3 Fantasia in E major ("The Rivulet") (MWV U 72)
 Op. 17, Variations concertantes in D major for cello and piano (1829) (MWV Q 19)
 Op. 18, String Quintet No. 1 in A major (1826/32) (MWV R 21)
 Op. 19a, 6 Songs for voice and piano (1830/34)
 No. 1 "Frühlingslied: In dem Walde, süsse Tone" (MWV K 56)
 No. 2 "Das erste Veilchen: Als ich das erste Veilchen erblickt" (MWV K 63)
 No. 3 "Winterlied: Mein Sohn, wo willst du hin so spät" (MWV K 72)
 No. 4 "Neue Liebe: In dem Mondenschein im Walde" (MWV K 70)
 No. 5 "Gruss: Leise zieht durch mein Gemüth" (MWV K 71)
 No. 6 "Reiselied: Bringet des treusten Herzens Grüsse" (MWV K 65)
 Op. 19b, Songs Without Words for piano, Book I (1829/30)
 No. 1 Andante con moto in E major (MWV U 86)
 No. 2 Andante espressivo in A minor (MWV U 80)
 No. 3 Molto allegro e vivace in A major ("Hunting Song") (MWV U 89)
 No. 4 Moderato in A major (MWV U 73)
 No. 5 Poco agitato in F-sharp minor (MWV U 90)
 No. 6 Andante sostenuto in G minor ("Venezianisches Gondellied" [Venetian Boat Song] No. 1) (MWV U 78)
 Op. 20, String Octet in E-flat major for double String Quartet (1825) (MWV R 20)

Op. 21–40
 Op. 21, A Midsummer Night's Dream, Overture in E major for orchestra (1826) (MWV P 3)
 Op. 22, Capriccio Brillant in B minor for piano and orchestra (1832) (MWV O 8)
 Op. 23, Kirchenmusik/3 Sacred pieces for soloists, choir, and organ/ensemble (1830)
 No. 1 Aus tiefer Not schrei' ich zu dir (MWV B 20)
 No. 2 Ave Maria (MWV B 19)
 No. 3 Mitten wir im Leben sind mit dem Tod umfangen (MWV B 21)
 Op. 24, Overture in C major for wind instruments (1824/38) (MWV P 1)
 Op. 25, Piano Concerto No. 1 in G minor (1831) (MWV O 7)
 Op. 26, The Hebrides or Fingal's Cave, Overture in B minor for orchestra (1830/32). (MWV P 7)
 Op. 27, Meeresstille und glückliche Fahrt (Calm Sea and Prosperous Voyage), Overture in D major for orchestra (1828) (MWV P 5)
 Op. 28, Fantasia in F-sharp minor for piano ("Sonate écossaise") (MWV U 92)
 Op. 29, Rondo brillant in E flat major for piano and orchestra (1834) (MWV O 10)
 Op. 30, Songs Without Words for piano, Book II (1833/34)
 No. 1 Andante espressivo in E-flat major (MWV U 103)
 No. 2 Allegro di molto in B-flat minor (MWV U 77)
 No. 3 Adagio non troppo in E major (MWV U 104)
 No. 4 Agitato e con fuoco in B minor (MWV U 98)
 No. 5 Andante grazioso in D major (MWV U 97)
 No. 6 Allegretto tranquillo in F-sharp minor ("Venezianisches Gondellied" or Venetian Boat Song No. 2) (MWV U 110)
 Op. 31, Nicht unserm Namen, Herr for choir and orchestra (1830) (MWV A 9)
 Op. 32, Das Märchen von der schönen Melusine (The Beautiful Melusine), Overture in F major for orchestra (1833) (MWV P 12)
 Op. 33, 3 Caprices for piano (1833/35)
 No. 1 Caprice in A minor (MWV U 99)
 No. 2 Caprice in E major (MWV U 112)
 No. 3 Caprice in B-flat minor (MWV U 95)
 Op. 34, 6 Songs for voice and piano (1834/36)
 No. 1 "Minnelied: Leucht't heller als die Sonne" (MWV K 80)
 No. 2 "Auf Flügeln des Gesanges" (MWV K 86)
 No. 3 "Frühlingslied: Es brechen im schallenden Reigen" (MWV K 89)
 No. 4 "Suleika: Ach, um deine feuchten Schwingen" (MWV K 92)
 No. 5 "Sonntagslied: Ringsum erschallt in Wald und Flur" (MWV K 84)
 No. 6 "Reiselied: Der Herbstwind rüttelt die Bäume" (MWV K 90)
 Op. 35, 6 Preludes and Fugues for piano (1827/37)
 No. 1 Prelude and Fugue in E minor (MWV U 116, MWV U 66)
 No. 2 Prelude and Fugue in D major (MWV U 129, MWV U 105)
 No. 3 Prelude and Fugue in B minor (MWV U 131, MWV U 91)
 No. 4 Prelude and Fugue in A-flat major (MWV U 122, MWV U 108)
 No. 5 Prelude and Fugue in F minor (MWV U 126, MWV U 106)
 No. 6 Prelude and Fugue in B-flat major (MWV U 135, MWV U 128)
 Op. 36, St. Paul (Oratorio) for choir and orchestra (1836) (MWV A 14)
 Op. 37, 3 Preludes and Fugues for organ (1837)
 No. 1 Prelude and Fugue in C minor (MWV W 21, MWV W 18)
 No. 2 Prelude and Fugue in G major (MWV W 22, MWV W 20)
 No. 3 Prelude and Fugue in D minor (MWV W 23, MWV W 13)
 Op. 38, Songs Without Words for piano, Book III (1836/37)
 No. 1 Con moto in E-flat major (MWV U 121)
 No. 2 Allegro non troppo in C minor (MWV U 115)
 No. 3 Presto e molto vivace in E major (MWV U 107)
 No. 4 Andante in A major (MWV U 120)
 No. 5 Agitato in A minor (MWV U 137)
 No. 6 Andante con moto in A-flat major ("Duetto") (MWV U 119)
 Op. 39, 3 Motets for female choir and organ (1830)
 No. 1 Veni, Domine (MWV B 24)
 No. 2 Laudate pueri (MWV B 30)
 No. 3 Surrexit pastor (MWV B 23)
 Op. 40, Piano Concerto No. 2 in D minor (1837) (MWV O 11)

Op. 41–60
 Op. 41, 6 Lieder for mixed voices a cappella (1834/38)
 No. 1 "Im Walde: Ihr Vögel in den Zweigen schwank" (MWV F 10)
 No. 2 "Entflieh' mit mir: Entflieh' mit mir" (MWV F 4)
 No. 3 "Es fiel ein Reif: Es fiel ein Reif" (MWV F 5)
 No. 4 "Auf ihrem Grab: Auf ihrem Grab" (MWV F 6)
 No. 5 "Mailied: Der Schnee zerrinnt" (MWV F 7)
 No. 6 "Auf dem See: Und frische Nahrung" (MWV F 9)
 Op. 42, Psalm 42 for choir and orchestra (1837) (MWV A 15)
 Op. 43, Serenade and Allegro giocoso in B minor for piano and orchestra (1838) (MWV O 12)
 Op. 44, 3 String Quartets
 1. String Quartet No. 3 in D major (1838) (MWV R 30)
 2. String Quartet No. 4 in E minor (1837) (MWV R 26) (actually composed before Op. 44/1)
 3. String Quartet No. 5 in E-flat major (1838) (MWV R 28)
 Op. 45, Cello Sonata No. 1 in B-flat major (1838) (MWV Q 27)
 Op. 46, Psalm XCV ("Come, let us sing") for SST soloists, choir and orchestra (1838) (MWV A 16)
 Op. 47, 6 Songs for voice and piano (1839)
 No. 1 "Minnelied: Wie der Quell so lieblich klinget" (MWV K 97)
 No. 2 "Morgengruss: Über die Berge steigt schon die Sonne" (MWV K 100)
 No. 3 "Frühlingslied: Durch den Wald, den dunklen, geht" (MWV K 101)
 No. 4 "Volkslied: Es ist bestimmt in Gottes Rath" (MWV K 102)
 No. 5 "Der Blumenstrauss: Sie wandelt im Blumengarten" (MWV K 73)
 No. 6 "Bei der Wiege: Schlummre! Schlummre und träume von kommender Zeit" (MWV K 77)
 Op. 48, Der erste Frühlingstag [The first day of Spring] for mixed voices a cappella (1839)
 No. 1 "Frühlingsahnung: O sanfter süsser Hauch" (MWV F 14)
 No. 2 "Die Primel: Liebliche Blume" (MWV F 16)
 No. 3 "Frühlingsfeier: Süsser, goldner Frühlingstag" (MWV F 18)
 No. 4 "Lerchengesang: Wie lieblicher Klang" (MWV F 13)
 No. 5 "Morgengebet: O wunderbares tiefes Schweigen" (MWV F 15)
 No. 6 "Herbstlied: Holder Lenz, du bist dahin" (MWV F 17)
 Op. 49, Piano Trio No. 1 in D minor (1839) (MWV Q 29)
 Op. 50, 6 Lieder for four male voices a cappella (1837/40)
 No. 1 "Türkisches Schenkenlied: Setze mir nicht, du Grobian" (MWV G 23)
 No. 2 "Der Jäger Abschied: Wer hat dich, du schöner Wald" (MWV G 27)
 No. 3 "Sommerlied: Wie Feld und Au' so blinkend im Thau" (MWV G 19)
 No. 4 "Wasserfahrt: Am fernen Horizonte" (MWV G 17)
 No. 5 "Liebe und Wein: Liebesschmerz. Was quälte dir dein armes Herz" (MWV G 26)
 No. 6 "Wanderlied: Vom Grund bis zu den Gipfeln" (MWV G 28)
 Op. 51, Psalm CXIV ("When Israel out of Egypt came") for double choir and orchestra (1839) (MWV A 17)
 Op. Posth. 52, Lobgesang (Hymn of Praise), Symphony-Cantata on Words of the Holy Bible, for Soloists, Chorus and Orchestra (1840) (posthumously named Symphony No. 2 in B-flat major) (MWV A 18)
 Op. 53, Songs Without Words for piano, Book IV (1839/41)
 No. 1 Andante con moto in A-flat major (MWV U 143)
 No. 2 Allegro non troppo in E-flat major (MWV U 109)
 No. 3 Presto agitato in G minor (MWV U 144)
 No. 4 Adagio in F major (MWV U 114)
 No. 5 Allegro con fuoco in A minor ("Volkslied") (MWV U 153)
 No. 6 Molto Allegro vivace in A major (MWV U 154)
 Op. 54, Variations sérieuses for piano (1841) (MWV U 156)
 Op. 55, Antigone, incidental music for narrators, soloists, double male chorus and orchestra (1841) (MWV M 12)
 Op. 56, Symphony No. 3 in A minor ("Scottish") (1841/42) (MWV N 18) (actually the composer's last Symphony)
 Op. 57, 6 Lieder for voice and piano
 No. 1 "Altdeutsches Lied: Es ist in den Wald gesungen" (MWV K 104)
 No. 2 "Hirtenlied: O Winter, schlimmer Winter" (MWV K 103)
 No. 3 "Suleika: Was bedeutet die Bewegung?" (MWV K 93)
 No. 4 "O Jugend, o schöne Rosenzeit!: Von allen schönen Kindern auf der Welt" (MWV K 106)
 No. 5 "Venetianisches Gondellied: Wenn durch die Piazetta" (MWV K 114)
 No. 6 "Wanderlied: Laue Luft kommt blau geflossen" (MWV K 108)
 Op. 58, Cello Sonata No. 2 in D major (1843) (MWV Q 32)
 Op. 59, Im Grünen, Sechs Lieder for mixed voices a cappella (1837/43)
 No. 1 "Im Grünen: Im Grün erwacht der frische Muth" (MWV F 8)
 No. 2 "Frühzeitiger Frühling: Tage der Wonne, kommt ihr so bald" (MWV F 23)
 No. 3 "Abschied vom Wald: O Thaler weit, o Höhen" (MWV F 20)
 No. 4 "Die Nachtigall: Die Nachtigall, sie war entfernt" (MWV F 24)
 No. 5 "Ruhetal: Wann im letzten Abendstrahl" (MWV F 21)
 No. 6 "Jagdlied: Durch schwankende Wipfel" (MWV F 22)
 Op. 60, Die erste Walpurgisnacht, Cantata for soloists, choir and orchestra (1833) (MWV D 3)

Op. 61–72
 Op. 61, A Midsummer Night's Dream, incidental music for soloists, female chorus and orchestra (1842) (MWV M 13)
 – Scherzo
 – Notturno
 – Wedding March
 Op. 62, Songs Without Words for piano, Book V (1842/44)
 No. 1 Andante espressivo in G major (MWV U 185)
 No. 2 Allegro con fuoco in B-flat major (MWV U 181)
 No. 3 Andante maestoso in E minor ("Trauermarsch") (MWV U 177)
 No. 4 Allegro con anima in G major (MWV U 175)
 No. 5 Andante con moto in A minor ("Venezianisches Gondellied" or Venetian Boat Song No. 3) (MWV U 151)
 No. 6 Allegretto grazioso in A major ("Frühlingslied" or "Spring Song") (MWV U 161)
 Op. 63, 6 Lieder (Duets) for 2 voices and piano (1836/45)
 No. 1 "Ich wollt' meine Lieb' ergösse sich: Ich wollt' meine Lieb' ergösse sich" (MWV J 5)
 No. 2 "Abschied der Zugvögel: Wie war so schön doch Wald und Feld!" (MWV J 9)
 No. 3 "Gruss: Wohin ich geh' und schaue" (MWV J 8)
 No. 4 "Herbstlied: Ach, wie so bald verhallet der Reigen" (MWV J 11)
 No. 5 "Volkslied: O sah' ich auf der Haide dort im Sturme dich" (MWV J 10)
 No. 6 "Maiglöckchen und die Blümelein: Maiglöckchen läutet in dem Thal" (MWV J 7)
 Op. 64, Violin Concerto (No. 2) in E minor (1844) (MWV O 14)
 Op. 65, (6) Organ Sonatas (1844/45)
 1. Organ Sonata No. 1 in F minor (1844) (MWV W 56)
 2. Organ Sonata No. 2 in C minor (1844) (MWV W 57)
 3. Organ Sonata No. 3 in A major (1844) (MWV W 58)
 4. Organ Sonata No. 4 in B-flat major (1845) (MWV W 59)
 5. Organ Sonata No. 5 in D major (1844) (MWV W 60)
 6. Organ Sonata No. 6 in D minor (1845) (MWV W 61)
 Op. 66, Piano Trio No. 2 in C minor (1845) (MWV Q 33)
 Op. 67, (6) Songs Without Words for piano, Book VI (1843/45)
 No. 1 Andante in E-flat major (MWV U 180)
 No. 2 Allegro leggiero in F-sharp minor (MWV U 145)
 No. 3 Andante tranquillo in B-flat major (MWV U 102)
 No. 4 Presto in C major ("Spinnerlied") (MWV U 182)
 No. 5 Moderato in B minor (MWV U 184)
 No. 6 Allegro non troppo in E major (MWV U 188)
 Op. 68, Festgesang an die Künstler: Der Menschheit Würde, Cantata for male chorus & brass (1846) (MWV D 6)
 Op. 69, 3 Motets for choir (1847)
 No. 1 Nunc dimittis (MWV B 60)
 No. 2 Jubilate (MWV B 58)
 No. 3 Magnificat (MWV B 59)
 Op. 70, Elijah (Oratorio) for choir and orchestra (1846) (MWV A 25)
 Op. 71, 6 Lieder for voice and piano
 No. 1 "Tröstung: Werde heiter, mein Gemüthe" (MWV K 120)
 No. 2 "Frühlingslied: Der Frühling naht mit Brausen" (MWV K 119)
 No. 3 "An die Entfernte: Diese Rose pflück' ich hier" (MWV K 126)
 No. 4 "Schilflied: Auf dem Teich, dem regungslosen" (MWV K 116)
 No. 5 "Auf der Wanderschaft: Ich wand're fort ins ferne Land" (MWV K 124)
 No. 6 "Nachtlied: Vergangen ist der lichte Tag" (MWV K 125)
 Op. 72, (6) Kinderstücke [Children's pieces] for piano (1842)
 No. 1 Allegro non troppo in G major (MWV U 171)
 No. 2 Andante sostenuto in E-flat major (MWV U 170)
 No. 3 Allegretto in G major (MWV U 164)
 No. 4 Andante con moto in D major (MWV U 169)
 No. 5 Allegro assai in G minor (MWV U 166)
 No. 6 Vivace in F major (MWV U 168)

Works with opus number assigned posthumously

Op. Posth. 73–80
 Op. Posth. 73, Lauda Sion, for soloists, choir and orchestra (1846) (MWV A 24)
 Lauda Sion salvatorem
 Laudis thema specialis
 Sit laus plena sit sonora
 In hac mensa novi regis
 Docti sacris institutis
 Caro cibus, sanguis potus
 Sumit unus, summunt mille
 Op. Posth. 74, Athalie, incidental music for narrators, soloists, double chorus and orchestra (1845) (MWV M 16)
 Op. Posth. 75, Wandersmann
 No. 1 "Der frohe Wandersmann: Wem Gott will rechte Gunst" (MWV G 34)
 No. 2 "Abendständchen: Schlafe, Liebchen, weil's auf Erden" (MWV G 24)
 No. 3 "Trinklied: So lang man nüchtern ist" (MWV G 15)
 No. 4 "Abschiedstafel: So ruckt denn in die Runde" (MWV G 33)
 Op. Posth. 76, 4 Lieder for four male voices (1844/46)
 No. 1 "Das Lied vom braven Mann: Gaben mir Rath und gute Lehren" (MWV G 16)
 No. 2 "Rheinweinlied: Wo solch' ein Feuer noch gedeiht" (MWV G 35)
 No. 3 "Lied für die Deutschen in Lyon: Was uns eint als deutsche" (MWV G 36)
 No. 4 "Comitat: Nun zu guter Letzt" (MWV G 38)
 Op. Posth. 77, 3 Lieder for voice and piano (1836/47)
 No. 1 "Sonntagsmorgen: Das ist der Tag des Herrn" (MWV J 4)
 No. 2 "Das Ährenfeld: Ein Leben war's im Ährenfeld" (MWV J 12)
 No. 3 "Lied aus "Ruy Blas": Wozu der Vöglein Chöre belauschen fern und nah?" (MWV J 6)
 Op. Posth. 78, 3 Psalms for choir a cappella
 No. 1 Psalm II ("Warum toben die Heiden" – "Why rage fiercely the heathen?") (1843) (MWV B 41)
 No. 2 Psalm XLIII ("Richte mich, Gott und führe meine Sache" – "Judge me, O God") (1844) (MWV B 46)
 No. 3 Psalm XXII ("Mein Gott, warum hast du mich verlassen" – "My God, my God!") (1844) (MWV B 51)
 Op. Posth. 79, 6 Anthems (Sechs Sprüche) for eight voices a cappella (1844/46)
 No. 1 "Rejoice, O ye people" ("Frohlocket, ihr Völker auf Erden") (MWV B 42)
 No. 2 "Thou, Lord, hast been our refuge" ("Herr Gott, du bist unsre Zuflucht") (MWV B 44)
 No. 3 "Above all praise" ("Erhaben, o Herr, über alles Lob") (MWV B 55)
 No. 4 "Lord, on our offences" ("Herr, gedenke nicht unsrer Übeltaten") (MWV B 50)
 No. 5 "Let our hearts be joyful" ("Lasset uns frohlocken") (MWV B 54)
 No. 6 "For our offences ("Um unsrer Sünden willen") (MWV B 52)
 Op. Posth. 80, String Quartet No. 6 in F minor (1847) (MWV R 37)

 Op. Posth. 81–100 
 Op. Posth. 81, 4 Pieces for String Quartet (1843/47)
 No. 1 Andante in E major (MWV R 34)
 No. 2 Scherzo in A minor (MWV R 35)
 No. 3 Capriccio in E minor (MWV R 32)
 No. 4 Fugue in E-flat major (MWV R 23)
 Op. Posth. 82, Variations in E-flat major for piano (1841) (MWV U 158)
 Op. Posth. 83, Variations in B-flat major for piano (also for piano, four hands) (1841) (MWV U 159)
 Op. Posth. 84, 3 Lieder for bass voice and piano (1831/39)
 No. 1 "Da lieg' ich unter den Bäumen: Da lieg' ich unter den Bäumen" (MWV K 69)
 No. 2 "Herbstlied: Im Walde rauschen dürre Blätter" (MWV K 99)
 No. 3 "Jagdlied: Mit Lust tät ich ausreiten" (MWV K 82)
 Op. Posth. 85, (6) Songs Without Words for piano, Book VII (1834/45)
 No. 1 Andante espressivo in F major (MWV U 150)
 No. 2 Allegro agitato in A minor (MWV U 101)
 No. 3 Presto in E-flat major (MWV U 111)
 No. 4 Andante sostenuto in D major (MWV U 190)
 No. 5 Allegretto in A major (MWV U 191)
 No. 6 Allegretto con moto in B-flat major (MWV U 155)
 Op. Posth. 86, 6 Songs for voice and piano (1826/47)
 No. 1 "Es lauschte das Laub: Es lauschte das Laub so dunkelgrun" (MWV K 29)
 No. 2 "Morgenlied: Erwacht in neuer Starke" (MWV K 123)
 No. 3 "Die Liebende schreibt: Ein Blick von deinen Augen" (MWV K 66)
 No. 4 "Allnächtlich im Traume seh' ich dich: Allnächtlich im Traume" (MWV K 78)
 No. 5 "Der Mond: Mein Herz ist wie die dunkle Nacht" (MWV K 122)
 No. 6 "Altdeutsches Frühlingslied: Der trübe Winter ist vorbei" (MWV K 127)
 Op. Posth. 87, String Quintet No. 2 in B-flat major (1845) (MWV R 33)
 Op. Posth. 88, 6 Lieder for four mixed voices a cappella (1839/44)
 No. 1 "Neujahrslied: Mit der Freude zieht der Schmerz" (MWV F 28)
 No. 2 "Der Glückliche: Ich hab' ein Liebchen" (MWV F 27)
 No. 3 "Hirtenlied: O Winter, schlimmer Winter" (MWV F 12)
 No. 4 "Die Waldvögelein: Kommt, lasst uns geh'n spazieren" (MWV F 25)
 No. 5 "Deutschland: Durch tiefe Nacht ein Brausen zieht" (MWV F 33)
 No. 6 "Der wandernde Musikant: Durch Feld und Buchenhallen" (MWV F 19)
 Op. Posth. 89,  Die Heimkehr aus der Fremde  (Singspiel) (1829) (MWV L 6)
 Op. Posth. 90, Symphony No. 4 in A major ("Italian") (1833) (MWV N 16) (actually the composer's 3rd Symphony)
 Op. Posth. 91, Psalm XCVIII ("Sing to the Lord a new song") for choir, orchestra, and organ (1843) (MWV A 23)
 Op. Posth. 92, Allegro brillant in A major for piano, four hands (1841) (MWV T 4)
 Op. Posth. 93, Oedipus at Colonos, incidental music for narrators, soloists, double male chorus and orchestra (1845) (MWV M 14)
 Op. Posth. 94, Infelice: Unglückselge! … Kehret wieder in B-flat major for soprano and orchestra (two versions: London, 1834 and Leipzig, 1842) (MWV H 4, MWV H 5)
 Op. Posth. 95, Ruy Blas, Overture in C minor for orchestra (1839) (MWV P 15)
 Op. Posth. 96, 3 Hymns for alto solo, choir and orchestra (1843) (MWV A 19) (From WoO 14)
 Op. Posth. 97, Christus (Oratorio) (unfinished) (1847) (MWV A 26)
 Op. Posth. 98, Loreley (opera) (unfinished) (1847) (MWV L 7)
 Op. Posth. 99, 6 Songs for voice and piano (1841/45)
 No. 1 "Erster Verlust: Ach, wer bringt die schönen Tage" (MWV K 110)
 No. 2 "Die Sterne schau'n in stiller Nacht: Die Sterne schau'n in stiller Nacht" (MWV K 19)
 No. 3 "Lieblingsplätzchen: Wisst ihr, wo ich gerne weil'" (MWV K 61)
 No. 4 "Das Schifflein: Ein Schifflein ziehet leise" (MWV K 109)
 No. 5 "Wenn sich zwei Herzen scheiden: Wenn sich zwei Herzen scheiden" (MWV K 121)
 No. 6 "Es weiss und rät es doch Keiner: Es weiss und rät es doch Keiner" (MWV K 112)
 Op. Posth. 100, 4 Lieder for four voices a cappella (1839/44)
 No. 1 "Andenken: Die Bäume grünen überall" (MWV F 29)
 No. 2 "Lob des Frühlings: Saatengrün, Veilchenduft" (MWV F 26)
 No. 3 "Frühlingslied: Berg und Thal will ich durchstreifen" (MWV F 30)
 No. 4 "Im Wald: O Wald, du kühlender Bronnen" (MWV F 11)

 Op. Posth. 101–121 
 Op. Posth. 101, Trumpet Overture, Overture in C major for orchestra (1826) (MWV P 2)
 Op. Posth. 102, (6) Songs Without Words for piano, Book VIII (1842/45)
 No. 1 Andante un poco agitato in E minor (MWV U 162)
 No. 2 Adagio in D major (MWV U 192)
 No. 3 Presto in C major ("Tarantelle") ("Kinderstuck") (MWV U 195)
 No. 4 Un poco agitato, ma andante in G minor ("The Sighing Wind") (MWV U 152)
 No. 5 Allegro vivace in A major ("The Joyous Peasant") ("Kinderstuck") (MWV U 194)
 No. 6 Andante in C major ("Belief") (MWV U 172)
 Op. Posth. 103, Trauermarsch [Funeral March] in A minor for military orchestra (1836) (MWV P 14)
 Op. Posth. 104a, 3 Preludes for piano (1834)
 No. 1 Prelude in B-flat major (MWV U 132)
 No. 2 Prelude in B minor (MWV U 123)
 No. 3 Prelude in D major (MWV U 127)
 Op. Posth. 104b, 3 Études for piano (1834/38)
 No. 1 Étude in B-flat minor (MWV U 117)
 No. 2 Étude in F major (MWV U 100)
 No. 3 Étude in A minor (MWV U 142)
 Op. Posth. 105, Piano Sonata No. 2 in G minor (1821) (MWV U 30) (actually Mendelssohn's 1st Piano Sonata)
 Op. Posth. 106, Piano Sonata No. 3 in B-flat major (1827) (MWV U 64)
 Op. Posth. 107, Symphony No. 5 in D major/minor ("Reformation") (1830) (MWV N 15) (actually the composer's 2nd Symphony)
 Op. Posth. 108, March in D major for orchestra (1841) (MWV P 16)
 Op. Posth. 109, Song without words in D major for cello and piano (1845) (MWV Q 34)
 Op. Posth. 110, Piano Sextet in D major (1824) (MWV Q 16)
 Op. Posth. 111, Tu es Petrus in A major for five voices and orchestra (1827) (MWV A 4)
 Op. Posth. 112, 2 Sacred songs for voice and piano (1835)
 No. 1 "Doch der Herr, er leitet die Irrenden recht"
 No. 2 "Der du die Menschen lassest sterben"
 Op. Posth. 113, Concert Piece No. 1 in F minor for clarinet, basset-horn, and piano (1833) (MWV Q 23)
 Op. Posth. 114, Concert Piece No. 2 in D minor for clarinet, basset-horn, and piano (1833) (MWV Q 24)
 Op. Posth. 115, 2 Sacred choruses for male choir a cappella (1833)
 No. 1 "Beati mortui: Beati mortui in Domino" (MWV B 28)
 No. 2 "Periti autem: Periti autem fulgebunt" (MWV B 29)
 Op. Posth. 116, Trauer-Gesang: Sahst du ihn herniederschweben in der Morgen [Funeral Song] in G minor for mixed choir a cappella (1845) (MWV F 31)
 Op. Posth. 117, Albumblatt (Album-leaf ) in E minor ("Lied ohne Worte") for piano (1837) (MWV U 134)
 Op. Posth. 118, Capriccio in E major for piano (1837) (MWV U 139)
 Op. Posth. 119, Perpetuum mobile in C major for piano (MWV U 58)
 Op. Posth. 120, 4 Lieder for four male voices a cappella (1837/47)
 No. 1 "Jagdlied: Auf, ihr Herrn und Damen schön" (MWV G 21)
 No. 2 "Morgengruss des Thüringischen Sangerbundes: Seid gegrüsset, traute Bruder" (MWV G 37)
 No. 3 "Im Süden: Süsse Dufte, milde Lüfte" (MWV G 20)
 No. 4 "Zigeunerlied: Im Nebelgeriesel, im tiefen Schnee" (MWV G 5)
 Op. Posth. 121, Adspice Domine de sede for male choir and cello (1833) (MWV B 26)
 Adspice Domine de sede
 Asperi oculos tuos
 Qui regis Israel
 Asperi oculos tuos
 O lux beata

Works with WoO numbers

WoO 1 – 10WoO 1, Etude in F minor for piano (1826) (MWV U 125)WoO 2, Scherzo B minor for piano (1829) (MWV U 69)WoO 3, Scherzo a capriccio in F-sharp minor for piano (1835/36) (MWV U 113)WoO 4, 2 Romances, voice and piano (1833/34)
 No. 1 There be none of beauty's daughters, 1833 (MWV K 76)
 No. 2 Sun of the sleepless, 1834 (MWV K 85)WoO 5, Verleih uns Frieden for choir, and orchestra or Organ (1831) (MWV A 11)WoO 6, Andante cantabile e Presto agitato in B major for piano (1838) (MWV U 141)WoO 7, Der Blumenkranz: An Celia's Baum, lied (1829) (MWV K 44)WoO 8, Ersatz für Unbestand: Lieblich mundet der Becher Wein for 4 male voices (1839) (MWV G 25)WoO 9, Festgesang zum Gutenbergfest, for male chorus & brass (1840) (MWV D 4)WoO 10, Gondellied for piano (1837) (MWV U 136)

WoO 11 – 20WoO 11, 3 Folk Songs
 No. 1 Wie kann ich froh und lustig sein? (MWV J 1)
 No. 2 Abendlied (MWV J 2)
 No. 3 Wasserfahrt (MWV J 3)WoO 12, Lord, have mercy upon us for choir a capella (1833) (MWV B 27)WoO 13, Präludium und Fuge for piano ("Notre Temps") (1827/41) (MWV U 157, MWV U 65)WoO 14, 3 Sacred Songs (1840) (MWV B 33) (Later developed into Op. Posth. 96)
 No. 1 Lass', o Herr, mich Hülfe finden
 No. 2 Choral. Deines Kind's Gebet erhöre
 No. 3 Herr, wir trau'n auf deine GüteWoO 15, Hymn Hör mein Bitten / Hear My Prayer (1844) (MWV B 49)WoO 16, Song Warnung vor dem Rhein (MWV K 105)WoO 17, 2 Songs (1835)
 No. 1 Das Waldschloss (MWV K 87)
 No. 2 Pagenlied (MWV K 75)WoO 18, 2 Songs (1834/41)
 No. 1 Ich hör' ein Vöglein (A. Böttger, 1841) (MWV K 107)
 No. 2 Todeslied der Bojaren (C. Immermann, 1834) (MWV K 68)WoO 19, Andante cantabile e Presto agitato in B-flat major/G minor for piano (MWV U 93, MWV U 94)WoO 20, Seemanns Scheidelied, lied (1831) (MWV K 48)

WoO 21 – 29WoO 21, Nachtgesang, for four male voices (1842) (MWV G 29)WoO 22, Die Stiftungsfeier, for four male voices (1842) (MWV G 32)WoO 23, Des Mädchens Klage, song (MWV K 25)WoO 24, Kyrie eleison (1846) (MWV B 57/1)WoO 25, Duo concertant, variations on Carl Maria von Weber's march 'La preciosa' for two pianos (1833) (MWV O 9)WoO 26, Ehre sei Gott in der Höhe (1846)WoO 27, Heilig for choir (MWV B 47 same as MWV B 57/2)WoO 28, Psalm 100  Jauchzet dem Herrn, alle Welt for choir (1844) (MWV B 45)WoO 29', Te Deum (1832) (MWV B 25)

Works without opus or WoO number

 Recitative for Piano and Strings in G minor (1820) (MWV O 1)
 Trio for Piano, Violin and Viola in C minor (1820) (MWV Q 3)
 Violin Sonata (No. 1) in F major (1820) (MWV Q 7)
 Die Soldatenliebschaft, singspiel, (1820) (MWV L 1)
 19 miscellaneous pieces (plus several fragments) for organ (1820/45)
 Sinfonia for Strings No. 1 in C Major: I. Allegro, II. Andante, III. Allegro (1821) (MWV N 1)
 Sinfonia for Strings No. 2 in D Major: I. Allegro, II. Andante, III. Allegro vivace (1821) (MWV N 2)
 Sinfonia for Strings No. 3 in E minor: I. Allegro di molto, II. Andante, III. Allegro (1821) (MWV N 3)
 Sinfonia for Strings No. 4 in C minor: I. Grave - Allegro, II. Andante, III. Allegro vivace (1821) (MWV N 4)
 Sinfonia for Strings No. 5 in B-flat Major: I. Allegro vivace, II. Andante, III. Presto (1821) (MWV N 5)
 Sinfonia for Strings No. 6 in E-flat Major: I. Allegro, II. Menuetto, III. Prestissimo (1821) (MWV N 6)
 Piano Quartet in D minor (1821) (MWV Q 10)
 17 Fugues for String Quartet (1821) (MWV R 1-MWV R 17, some incomplete)
 Die beiden Pädagogen, singspiel, (1821) (MWV L 2)
 Sinfonia for Strings No. 7 in D minor: I. Allegro, II. Andante amorevole, III. Menuetto, IV. Allegro molto (1822) (MWV N 7)
 Sinfonia for Strings No. 8 in D Major: I. Adagio e Grave - Allegro, II. Adagio, III. Menuetto. (Presto), IV. Allegro molto (1822) (MWV N 8) (later arranged for full orchestra)
 Concerto for Piano and Strings in A minor (1822) (MWV O 2)
 Concerto (No. 1) for Violin and Strings in D minor (1823) (MWV O 3)
 Die wandernden Komödianten, singspiel, (1822) (MWV L 3)
 Sinfonia for Strings No. 9 in C Major: I. Grave - Allegro, II. Andante, III. Scherzo, IV. Allegro vivace (1823)  (MWV N 9)
 Sinfonia for Strings No. 10 in B minor: Adagio - Allegro - Più Presto (1823) (MWV N 10)
 Sinfonia for Strings No. 11 in F Major: I. Adagio - Allegro molto, II. 'Schweizerlied'. Scherzo comodo, III. Adagio, IV. Menuetto. Allegro moderato, V. Allegro molto (1823)  (MWV N 11)
 Sinfonia for Strings No. 12 in G minor: I.Fuga. (Grave) - Allegro, II. Andante, III. Allegro molto (1823)  (MWV N 12)
 "Symphoniesatz" (Sinfonia for Strings No. 13) movement in C minor: Grave - Allegro molto (1823) (MWV N 14)
 Concerto for Violin, Piano, and Strings in D minor (1823) (MWV O 4)
 Concerto for 2 Pianos and Orchestra (No. 1) in E major (1823) (MWV O 5)
 String Quartet in E-flat (1823) (MWV R 18)
 Der Onkel aus Boston, oder Die beiden Neffen, singspiel, (1823) (MWV L 4)
 Viola Sonata in C minor (1823/24) (MWV Q 14)
 Concerto for 2 Pianos and Orchestra (No. 2) in A-flat Major (1824) (MWV O 6)
 Clarinet Sonata in E-flat major (1824) (MWV Q 15)
 The Evening Bell in B flat for harp and piano (1829) (MWV Q 20)
 The Shepherd's Song in G minor for solo flute (MWV R 24)
 Assai tranquillo in B minor, for cello and piano (1835) (MWV Q 25)
 Violin Sonata (No. 3) in F major (1838) (MWV Q 26) (ed./publ. by Yehudi Menuhin, 1953)

Lost works
 3 Kindersymphonien (two performed in Berlin, Christmas Eve 1827 and 1828, and one of unknown dating, which are now lost)

Listed by genre
Vocal (each subsection in chronological order)
Operas

Incidental music
 Antigone, Op. 55 (1841), narrators, soloists, double male chorus and orchestra
 A Midsummer Night's Dream, Op. 61 (1843), soloists, female chorus and orchestra
 Athalie, Op. Posth. 74 (1845), narrators, soloists, double chorus and orchestra
 Oedipus at Colonos, Op. Posth. 93 (1845), narrators, soloists, double male chorus and orchestra

Oratorios
 St. Paul (Paulus), Op. 36 (1836)
 Elijah (Elias), Op. 70 (1846)
 Christus, Op. Posth. 97 (unfinished) (1847)

Chorale cantatas
Mendelssohn composed several chorale cantatas, several on Lutheran hymns:
 Christe du Lamm Gottes (1827), SATB, strings, on the German Agnus Dei
 Cantata on "Jesu, meine Freude" (1828), SATB, strings
 Wer nur den lieben Gott läßt walten on "Wer nur den lieben Gott läßt walten"(1829), S solo, SATB, strings
 Cantata on "O Haupt voll Blut und Wunden" (1830), baritone, SATB, orch.
 Vom Himmel hoch, Christmas cantata on "Vom Himmel hoch, da komm ich her" (1831), SB soloists, SATB, atrings
 Wir glauben all an einen Gott (1831), SATB, orch., on Luther's "Wir glauben all an einen Gott"
 Cantata on "Ach Gott, vom Himmel sieh darein" (1832), baritone, SATB, strings

Psalms
 Gott du bist unsre Zuversicht (Psalm 46) (1821), 5vv
 Die Himmel erzählen (Psalm 19) (1821), SSATB
 Jauchzet Gott alle Lande (Psalm 66) (1822), SSA soli, SSASSA, bc
 Ich weiche nicht (Psalm 119:102) (1823?), SATB
 Deine Rede präge ich in meinem Herzen (Psalm 119:11) (1823?), SATB
 Nicht unserm Namen, Herr (Psalm 115), Op. 31 (1835), S solo, SATB, orch.
 Wie der Hirsch schreit nach frischem Wasser (Psalm 42), Op. 42 (1838), Solo: STTBB, Choir: SATB, Orchestra (partially reused in Richte mich Gott)
 Defend Me, Lord (Psalm 31) (1839)
 Lord, hear the voice (Psalm 5) (1839), male chorus
 Da Israel aus Aegypten zog (Psalm 114), Op. 51 (1841), SSAATTBB, orch.
 Kommt, laßt uns anbeten und knien von dem Herrn (Psalm 95), Op. 46 (1842), SST soli, choir and orch.
 3 Hymns (Psalm 13), Op. Posth. 96 (1843) (From WoO 14), for alto solo, choir and orchestra
Singet dem Herrn ein neues Lied (Psalm 98), Op. Posth. 91 (1843), SATBSATB, orch.
 Jauchzet dem Herrn, alle Welt (Psalm 100) (1844), SATB, WoO 28
Hymn Hör mein Bitten / Hear My Prayer (paraphrase of Psalm 55), (1844), S solo, SATB, organ, WoO 15
 Denn er hat seinen Engeln befohlen (Psalm 91), (1844) SSAATTBB (reused in Elijah)
Three Psalms, Op. Posth. 78 (1845), 8vv
 Warum toben die Heiden ("Why rage fiercely the heathen?") (Psalm 2)
 Richte mich Gott ("Judge me, O God") (Psalm 43)
 Mein Gott, warum hast du mich verlassen ("My God, why hast thou forsaken me?") (Psalm 22)

Other choral works
Accompanied:
 Te Deum in D (1826), double ch. & bc.
 Tu es Petrus, Op. Posth. 111 (1827)
 3 Motets for female choir and organ Op. 39 (1830 + 1837 (No. 2) )
 No. 1 Veni, Domine (MWV B 24)
 No. 2 Laudate pueri (MWV B 30)
 No. 3 Surrexit pastor (MWV B 23)

 Kirchenmusik, 3 Sacred pieces for soloists, choir, and organ/ensemble Op. 23 (1830)
 No. 1 Aus tiefer Not schrei' ich zu dir (MWV B 20)
 No. 2 Ave Maria (MWV B 19)
 No. 3 Mitten wir im Leben sind mit dem Tod umfangen (MWV B 21)

 Die erste Walpurgisnacht, Op. 60 (1833), soloists, choir and orchestra
 Adspice Domine de sede Vespergesang for male choir and cello Op. Posth. 121 (1833)  (MWV B 26)
 Adspice Domine de sede
 Asperi oculos tuos
 Qui regis Israel
 Asperi oculos tuos
 O lux beata

 Festgesang Gutenberg Cantata (1840), male chorus & brass
 Lobgesang, Op. Posth. 52 (Symphony No. 2 in B flat major) (1840), symphony-cantata for soloists, choir, organ and orchestra
 Festgesang an die Künstler: Der Menschheit Würde, Op. 68 (1846), male chorus & brass
 Lauda Sion, a setting of Lauda Sion, Op. Posth. 73 (1846)
 Es wird öffnen die Augen der Blinden (1846) (intended for Elijah)

A cappella

 2 Sacred choruses for male choir a cappella (1833), Op. Posth. 115
 No. 1 "Beati mortui: Beati mortui in Domino" (MWV B 28)
 No. 2 "Periti autem: Periti autem fulgebunt" (MWV B 29)
 Lord, have mercy upon us for choir a capella (1833), WoO 12

 Six Anthems (Sechs Sprüche), Op. Posth. 79 (1843–4), SSAATTBB
 Rejoice, O Ye People (Christmas) ("Frohlocket, ihr Völker auf Erden" – Weihnachten)
 Thou, Lord, Our Refuge (New Year) ("Herr Gott, du bist unsre Zuflucht" – Am Neujahrstage)
 Above All Praise (Ascension) ("Erhaben, o Herr, über alles Lob" – Am Himmelsfahrtstage)
 Lord, on Our Offences (Passiontide) ("Herr, gedenke nicht unsrer Übelthaten" – In der Passionszeit)
 Let Our Hearts Be Joyful (Advent) ("Lasset uns frohlocken" – Im Advent)
 For Our Offences (Good Friday) ("Um unsrer Sünden" – Am Karfreitag)

 Die Deutsche Liturgie (Kyrie, Sanctus, Gloria, Responses and Amen) (1846), 8vv
 Ehre sei Gott in der Höhe (1846), WoO 26
 Heilig (1846), WoO 27

Lieder & Songs
 Twelve Songs for voice and piano, Op. 8 (3 of the songs were composed by Fanny Mendelssohn, but published under Felix's name)
 Twelve Lieder for voice and piano, Op. 9 (3 of the lieder were composed by Fanny Mendelssohn, but published under Felix's name)
 Six Songs for voice and piano, Op. 19a
 Six Songs for voice and piano, Op. 34 (No. 2: "On Wings of Song")
 Six Lieder for mixed voices a cappella, Op. 41
 Six Songs for voice and piano, Op. 47
 Six Lieder for four male voices a cappella, Op. 50
 Six Lieder for voice and piano, Op. 57
 Im Grünen: Six lieder for mixed voices a cappella, Op. 59
 Six Lieder (Duets) for 2 voices and piano, Op. 63
 Six Lieder for voice and piano, Op. 71
 Four Lieder for four male voices, Op. Posth. 76
 Three Lieder for voice and piano, Op. Posth. 77
 Three Lieder for bass voice and piano, Op. Posth. 84
 Six Songs for voice and piano, Op. Posth. 86
 Six Lieder for four mixed voices a cappella, Op. Posth. 88
 Six Songs for voice and piano, Op. Posth. 99
 Four Lieder for four voices a cappella, Op. Posth. 100
 Two Sacred songs for voice and piano, Op. Posth. 112
 Four Lieder for four male voices a cappella, Op. Posth. 120

Instrumental (each subsection in chronological order)
Symphonies
 13 String Symphonies
 String Symphony No. 1 in C major (1821)
 String Symphony No. 2 in D major (1821)
 String Symphony No. 3 in E minor (1821)
 String Symphony No. 4 in C minor (1821)
 String Symphony No. 5 in B flat major (1821)
 String Symphony No. 6 in E flat major (1821)
 String Symphony No. 7 in D minor (1822)
 String Symphony No. 8 in D major (later arranged for full orchestra) (1822)
 String Symphony No. 9 in C minor (1823)
 String Symphony No. 10 in B minor (1823)
 String Symphony No. 11 in F major (1823)
 String Symphony No. 12 in G minor (1823)
 String Symphony No. 13 in C minor "Symphoniesatz" (single movement) (1823)
 Symphony No. 1 in C minor, Op. 11 (1824)
 Lobgesang, Op. Posth. 52 (Symphony No. 2 in B flat major) (1840), symphony-cantata for soloists, choir, organ and orchestra
 Symphony No. 3 in A minor, Op. 56 "Scottish" (1842)
 Symphony No. 4 in A major, Op. Posth. 90 "Italian" (1833)
 Symphony No. 5 in D major/minor, Op. Posth. 107 "Reformation" (1832)

Concertos and concertante works
 Piano Concerto (No. 0) in A minor, for piano and strings (1822)
 Piano Concerto No. 1 in G minor, Op. 25 (1831)
 Piano Concerto No. 2 in D minor, Op. 40 (1837)
 Piano Concerto No. 3 (fragment) in E minor, Op. Posth. (1844)
 Violin Concerto (No. 1) in D minor, for violin and strings (1822)
 Violin Concerto (No. 2) in E minor, Op. 64 (1844)
 Recitative in G minor, for piano and strings (1820)
 Capriccio brillant for Piano and Orchestra in B minor, Op. 22 (1826, published 1832)
 Rondo brillant for Piano and Orchestra in E flat major, Op. 29 (1834)
 Serenade and Allegro giocoso for Piano and Orchestra in B minor, Op. 43 (1838)
 Double Concerto for Violin, Piano and String Orchestra in D minor (1823)
 Concerto for 2 Pianos and Orchestra (No. 1) in E major (1823)
 Concerto for 2 Pianos and Orchestra (No. 2) in A flat major (1824)

Overtures and other orchestral works
 A Midsummer Night's Dream, Overture in E major for orchestra, op. 21 (1827)
 Overture in C major for wind instruments, op. 24 (1824)
 The Hebrides or Fingal's Cave, Overture in B minor for orchestra, op. 26 (1832)
 Meeresstille und glückliche Fahrt (Calm Sea and Prosperous Voyage), Overture in D major for orchestra, op. 27 (1828)
 Das Märchen von der schönen Melusine (The Beautiful Melusine), Overture in F major for orchestra, op. 32 (1834)
 Ruy Blas, Overture in C minor for orchestra, op. posth. 95 (1839)
 Trumpet Overture, Overture in C major for orchestra, op. posth. 101 (1826)
 Funeral March in A minor, op. posth. 103 (1836)
 March en D major, op. posth. 108 (1841)
 Kindersinfonie MWV P 4 (1827) (lost)
 Kindersinfonie MWV P 6 (1828) (lost)
 Kindersinfonie MWV P 8 (lost)

Chamber music
 Violin Sonata (No. 1) in F major (1820)
 Piano Trio (No. 0) in C minor (1820) 
 12 Fugues for String Quartet (1821)
 Piano Quartet (No. 0) in D minor (1821)
 Piano Quartet No. 1 in C minor, Op. 1
 String Quartet (No. 0) in E-flat major (1823)
 Piano Quartet No. 2 in F minor, Op. 2
 Piano Quartet No. 3 in B minor, Op. 3
 Viola Sonata in C minor (1824)
 Clarinet Sonata in E-flat major (1824)
 Violin Sonata (No. 2) in F minor, Op. 4
 String Quartet No. 1 in E flat major, Op. 12
 String Quartet No. 2 in A minor, Op. 13
 Variations concertantes in D major for cello and piano, Op. 17
 String Quintet No. 1 in A major, Op. 18
 String Octet in E flat major, Op. 20 (1825)
 The Evening Bell in B flat major for harp and piano (1829)
 The Shepherd's Song'' in G minor for solo flute
 Assai tranquillo in B minor, for cello and piano (1835) 
 String Quartet No. 3 in D major, Op. 44/1
 String Quartet No. 4 in E minor, Op. 44/2
 String Quartet No. 5 in E flat major, Op. 44/3
 Violin Sonata (No. 3) in F major (1838)
 Cello Sonata No. 1 in B flat major, Op. 45
 Piano Trio No. 1 in D minor, Op. 49
 Cello Sonata No. 2 in D major, Op. 58
 Piano Trio No. 2 in C minor, Op. 66
 String Quartet No. 6 in F minor, Op. Posth. 80
 Four pieces for string quartet, Op. Posth. 81
 String Quintet No. 2 in B flat major, Op. Posth. 87
 Lied ohne Worte (Song without Words) in D major for cello and piano, Op. Posth. 109 (1845)
 Piano Sextet in D major, Op. Posth. 110
 Concert Piece No. 1 in F minor for clarinet, basset-horn, and piano, Op. Posth. 113
 Concert Piece No. 2 in D minor for clarinet, basset-horn, and piano, Op. Posth. 114

Piano
 List of solo piano compositions by Felix Mendelssohn

Organ
 6 Organ Sonatas, Op. 65 (1844/45)
 3 Preludes and Fugues for organ, Op. 37 (1837)

See also
 Mendelssohn-Werkverzeichnis (MWV), the first modern fully researched music catalogue of the works of Felix Mendelssohn

Notes

References
Ralf Wehner: Thematic-systematic Catalogue of the Musical Works (MWV), Sächsische Akademie der Wissenschaften zu Leipzig
Complete list of works with MWV Numbers